Kwang Pu Chen (1880 – July 1976) was a Shanghai-based Chinese banker and State Councillor. He was the founder of the first modern Chinese savings bank, the Shanghai Commercial and Savings Bank, the Shanghai Commercial Bank, a travel agency, as well as the China Assurance Corporation Ltd.

He was one of China's most successful entrepreneurs in the twentieth century, particularly influential in the financial and business world of Shanghai.  He played a key role in negotiating financial aid from the United States in 1937-1940, working with Treasury Secretary Henry Morgenthau.

Linsun Cheng, in his Banking in Modern China: Entrepreneurs, Professional Managers, and the Development of Chinese, says, "It is almost impossible to describe any significant innovation in the history of modern Chinese banks without mentioning K. P. Chen's name."

Early life
In 1880, K. P. Chen was born in Dantu, Jiangsu province into a family with little education. He caught the attention of compradores of a foreign firm who decided to sponsor his education in America. He graduated in 1909 with a BSc. degree from the Wharton School at the University of Pennsylvania in Philadelphia.

After graduation, as part of the sponsorship agreement, he worked as an intern in an American bank for a year. He then returned to China where he joined the Nanyang Quanyehui or the Nanjing South Seas Exhibition, a China-hosted international exposition that showcased to the world both China’s modernization and cultural heritage.

Career

The Jiangsu Bank
K. P. Chen began his China banking career in 1913, when he joined a provincial government bank, the Kiangsu Provincial Bank, as its General Manager. There, he introduced something new nearly every day, believing innovation necessary for success.

He broke with tradition and moved the bank's headquarters from Jiangsu to the banking capital of Shanghai, made loans on credit of goods rather than personal credit and invited Western accountants to regularly audit the bank's balance books.

The bank established warehouses for its commodities lending operations, the first to do so in China.

He did all this in just a year, after which he was forced to resign when he refused to disclose the names of the bank's customers to a local warlord.

The Shanghai Commercial & Savings Bank (The Shanghai Bank)
In Shanghai in June 1915, K. P. Chen, together with some others including Chinese Red Cross President Zhuang Dezhi, founded the Shanghai Commercial and Savings Bank. Chen was appointed the bank's first General Manager. Chen had 80,000 Yuan in initial capital to found the bank. Their initial capital was so small the bank became known as "the Little Shanghai Bank".

His guiding principle was “service to society, support for industry, and prosperity to enhance international trade” and he made sure that his staff must be very polite and patient with their clients, small depositors. In his address to his staff in Qingdao branch, he emphasized that they must appreciate their customers business—whether for one or 100 Chinese dollars—must do their best to give their customers convenience, and must be friendly to businessmen. He said “the customer’s psychology always favors a busy place,” because the sight of a busy firm will make people trust it and claimed that the aim of The Shanghai Bank was to serve society and not just make a profit. So, even though some services would not be profitable, they still had to be offered. Chen Guangfu xiansheng lüezhuan (The short biography of Chen Guangfu, Taipei: Shanghai shangye chuxu yinhang, 1977, p. 31).

Innovation seems to have come naturally to K. P. Chen. It did not stop with the Kiangsu Bank. At the Shanghai Bank, contrary to what other banks were doing at the time, he concentrated on attracting deposits from the public instead of notes issuance.

K. P. Chen was the first to introduce "one dollar" accounts, encouraging savings among individual members of the greater public and took the lead in introducing many different types of savings programs.

The Shanghai Commercial and Savings Bank's motto, very reflective of Chen's values, was "service to society, support for industry, and development of international trade."

In 1928 the Shanghai Bank handled over 6 million Yuan in foreign exchange and became the number one private bank handling foreign exchange in China. The Chartered Bank of India, Australia and China became upset because of The Shanghai Bank's efforts to promote their foreign exchange business, and decided to refuse The Shanghai Bank's foreign exchange contracts. In retaliation K. P. Chen refused to accept contracts from the Chartered Bank and made this known to the Shanghai banking community through The Shanghai Bankers Association and The Shanghai Foreign Bankers Association, whom he rallied to his cause. Eventually the Chartered Bank came to cooperate with the Shanghai Bank through the mediation of a third party.

In 1931 he created a special trust department in the bank initially to rent out safety deposit boxes but later on including insurance and real estate operations among other things.

He traveled all over China. In the 1930s K. P. Chen would go into the Chinese countryside and attempt to make small farmers "banking-conscious", as observed by a Chartered Bank manager who accompanied Chen on one of his stints. "Don't go to Sinkiang. It's a very hard trip—even dangerous. And when you come back, no one will believe what you find there." he once told a Time Inc.'s Nanking correspondent, Frederick Gruin.

Travel Service Department of the Shanghai Commercial and Savings Bank
In 1923 K. P. Chen was treated badly when booking his passage at a British-run travel agency. On returning to Shanghai he decided to establish a travel service department within his bank to compete with the foreign travel agencies.

Having made the necessary preparations he submitted a proposal to the Ministry of Communications under the Northern Warlords Government (1912–1927), asking for permission to establish a travel service department and to sell train tickets on a commission basis.

Whilst the proposal was vociferously opposed by the many foreigners occupying important positions in many Chinese railways build with foreign loans at the National Railway Through Transport Conference, it was finally adopted thanks to the support of General Director of Communications Ye Gongche and others, and on August 1, 1923, the Travel Service Department of the Shanghai Commercial, the first of its kind run by Chinese compatriots, was born in the Banks Building on Ningpo road. It operated on a trial basis and opened only to those from "polite society" instead of to the wider populace, providing a comparatively limited business scope.

Its official opening ceremony was held on June 1, 1927 and the Shanghai Commercial and Savings Bank travel department was formally registered as the China Travel Service. Unfortunately, the average daily turnover in the next few months was too low to cover costs. This embarrassing situation provoked a series of complaints from the board of directors and Chen was obliged to make a thorough reshuffle.

With a total investment of US$50,000, the travel agency was separated from its parent company and had to take on the whole responsibility for its profit and loss from then on. Chen Xiangtao, once an official from the Shanghai Public Communications Bureau was assigned the post of general manager. In April 1928, it changed its name to China Travel Service (holdings) Co. Ltd. (abbreviated as CTS (holding)). The year 1931 was the heyday for the CTS, they won the right to deal in European train tickets for Chinese traveling overseas. In the same year CTS opened up more than 20 chain hostels around the country and its annual profits reached more than US$4 million.

The CTS halted its travel service during the War of Resistance against Japan (1937–45) but was unable to recover after the communist revolution in 1949. Along with the management of the Shanghai Commercial and Savings Bank, the CTS evacuated to Taiwan, but was unable to resume operations.  It declared bankruptcy in Taipei in July 1954 and retreated from the arena, but its epoch-making contribution to the Chinese Tourism Industry is still dwelt upon with great relish.

The mainland assets of the CTS were seized by Communist authorities, and today its successor is one of the state-owned large-scale lead enterprises managed by the State-owned Assets Supervision and Administration Commission of the State Council. The core business of CTS (holdings) includes travel, industry invests (steel and iron), the related real estate development and distribution trade.

The Three Musketeers
K. P. Chen cultivated close relationships with Li Ming (founder and CEO of Chekiang Industrial Bank and Chairman of the Shanghai Bankers Association), and Chang Kia-ngau who like he was, represented a new generation of modern bankers.

Half of his initial capital for the Shanghai Commercial and Savings Bank came from Li's sources.

In 1916, both K. P. Chen and Li Ming stood up for Chang Kia-ngau and accused the government of wrongfully issuing the order when Chang's Bank of China's Shanghai office got into trouble for refusing to obey the governments order to suspend banknote remittance. After this incident, the Bank of China was able to assert its independence from the Yuan Shih-k'ai regime in Peking and started nearly two decades of tremendous growth as China's largest private bank.

K. P. Chen initially became close to Chang Kia-ngau when he became a private financial consultant to the Bank of China at the time between leaving the Kiangsu Provincial Bank and the founding of the Shanghai Commercial and Savings Bank.

Probably because of his tiny initial capital, K. P. Chen received a long term interbank deposit of 50,000 Yuan from Chang Kia-ngau's Bank of China as reserve capital encouraging close cooperation between the two banks.  Chen and Chang shared a vision of using private capital to develop and modernize the country.

Liu Hongsheng, Insurance and The China Development Bank
In 1927 K. P. Chen teamed up with Liu Hongsheng (1888–1956) to establish an insurance company. Three years later Liu Hongsheng mortgaged his new eight-story group office building to K. P. Chen to raise the capital for launching The China Development Bank.

China's Wartime Finance Advisor
K. P. Chen was head of China's Currency Stabilization Board.

During World War II, the Shanghai Commercial and Savings Bank was devoted to consolidating the economy. In order to solve the financial problems, K. P. Chen represented the government of the Republic of China and negotiated with U.S.A. for loans. Some agreements were made:

1936: US-China Gold-Silver Agreement
1938: $25,000,000 Export-Import Bank loan
1939: Tung Oil Loan Agreement
1940: Tien Tin Loan Agreement

In 1938 when the Chinese Ambassador Wellington Koo called on U. S. Secretary of the Treasury Henry Morgenthau to seek financial aid, the U. S. Secretary told him it might be advisable for the Chinese Government to send K. P. Chen (whom Morgenthau had negotiated with in the past) to America to enquire after credit for the purchase of flour and grain goods.

In 1939 Finance Minister H.H. Kung, through K. P. Chen, endeavored to obtain assistance from the American Commercial Credit for the purchase of four airplanes, badly needed by the China National Aviation Corporation. K. P. Chen also participated in concluding a contract at Detroit to purchase 1,000 trucks from General Motors and Chrysler for the Chinese government.

Reputation was important to him and he always made sure he kept his promises and by so doing, demonstrated integrity and ensured that China met its commitments.

Time magazine on Monday, Apr. 6, 1942 reported that "Shy, determined Chinese financier K.P. Chen stuck a feather in his cap last week. From Chungking he wired Manhattan's Universal Trading Corp. to pay the final installment on a $22,000,000 Export-Import Bank loan smack on the tung-oil barrel head—nearly two years before the last installment on the loan was due." This showed U.S. Treasury officials that China could do business even when Japan controlled its coast. When he sought to borrow money from Washington in 1938, democracy was not considered good security but tung oil, essential in high-grade paints and varnishes, was. To make this work he founded Universal Trading Corp. in Manhattan to manage tung-oil sales, budgeting one-half of the proceeds to repay the debt. He also organized Foo Shing Trading Corp. in China to gather and ship the oil.

K. P. Chen made outstanding contributions in stabilizing the monetary system and raising funds for war of resistance.

After the communist revolution in mainland China, K.P. Chen followed the Kuomintang-led government to Taiwan, though his Shanghai Commercial and Savings Bank was unable to reestablish its headquarters until 1954.  In 1964, the bank was allowed to resume operations.  It was the only private bank from the mainland which was allowed to resume commercial operations after the retreat to Taiwan.  In 1976, K.P. Chen was succeeded by Chu Ju-tang as chairman of the bank.

Close Shave
In December 1941, K. P. Chen together with Finance Minister and Vice Premier H.H. Kung, his wife Soong Ai-ling and her sister, Madame Sun Yat-sen were caught in Hong Kong when war erupted in Asia. Amid a torrential downpour of bombs and artillery shells, K. P. Chen, Kung, and Madame Sun, were hustled into a plane, flown over the Japanese lines and set safely down, 200 miles inland. (From the Dec. 22, 1941 issue of TIME magazine).

Public Office
On April 17, 1947 Generalissimo Chiang Kai-shek, President of the National Government of the Republic of China nominated K. P. Chen to membership of the then new state council.

Champion of Human Capital Development
K. P. Chen believed in the power of people and saw his investment in their development as an investment in the future profits of the bank.

He approved an annual budget of 12,000 tael in silver and invited a former manager of the Deutsch-Asiatische Bank to lecture his staff on the theory and practice of foreign exchange market.

He set up an educational fund to send senior managers to America to continue their education and practice advanced banking skills there.

The bank had a global business network through its overseas representative offices managed by its senior managers.

Other positions
K. P. Chen, whose bank had been involved with the cotton industry since its early days, served as Chairman of the Cotton Control Commission or CCC. He was close to T. V. Soong, the Minister of Finance and Founder and Director of the National Economic Council, whose idea it was to make private entrepreneurs and capital a vital part of the CCC's nation-building efforts, and had long been involved in state-private projects sponsored by Soong.
K. P. Chen was the dynamic chairman of the Universal Trading Corporation (UTC), a wholly owned subsidiary of China's Nationalist Government, formed for the purpose of promoting Sino-American foreign trade. Chen, a successful, self-made capitalist entrepreneur, believed that UTC could be the perfect vehicle for his stewardship of China’s postwar economic reconstruction. He also placed a premium on Sino-American cooperation and communication.
K. P. Chen was Chairman of the China Committee of International Chamber of Commerce. He was also Chairman of China's Foreign Trade Commission.
K. P. Chen was a signatory to the 1938 appeal for U. S. support by 10 Chinese Associations in Shanghai following the occupation of Manchuria by Japan. (United States Department of State / Foreign relations of the United States diplomatic papers, 1932. The Far East Volume III (1932) -- The Far Eastern crisis: occupation of Manchuria by Japan and statement of policy by the United States, pp. 1–754)
K. P. Chen was a major financier of industrial projects. Often working together with others, he set up various textile, metals and trading companies. He was a member of the board of Fan Xudong's Yongli Group of Companies.

Evaluation 
Chen is considered one of China's most important bankers in the 20th century.

Linsun Cheng, in his Banking in Modern China: Entrepreneurs, Professional Managers, and the Development of Chinese, says, "It is almost impossible to describe any significant innovation in the history of modern Chinese banks without mentioning K. P. Chen's name."

On Monday, Mar. 18, 1940, Time magazine described him thus:

"Middle-aged Banker Chen (University of Pennsylvania '09) looks so much like a Westerner's idea of a Chinese banker that wily and subtle-minded Americans have difficulty in believing he is as simple and direct as he is... bespectacled, careful, shy of the press, close-mouthed (in the Calvin Coolidge rather than Sumner Welles sense), he has no hobbies, makes no picturesque Oriental remarks, works 24 hours a day at the unglamorous business of cementing U.S.-Chinese trade relations, and considers Chinese repayment of U. S. loans his personal responsibility. His pride: that China has repaid $2,300,000 of her previous $25,000,000 loan, is now, because of U. S. needs for tung oil and tin, ahead of schedule."

The most important elements in his success were his American education and connections; his sense of professionalism (demonstrated by his opposition to official interference); his ability to compete and collaborate with foreign firms; his desire to innovate and explore various business strategies; his skill at obtaining community and professional support; and the unity of Chinese bankers.

See also
Chinese financial system

Notes

References
 Tianshi, Yang. "Hu Shi and Chen Guangfu." Chinese Studies in History 39.3 (2006): 51-79.
 Lee, Pui-tak. The Making of Modern Chinese Financial Entrepreneurship: The Case of Chen Guangfu (University of Hong Kong)
 Ho Kwong Shing Lawrence. "China's Quest for American Monetary Aid: The Role of Chen Guangfu, 1935-1944". Ph.D. Thesis. The University of Hong Kong. 2010.
 Lee, P. T. Emergence of Modern Chinese Financial Corporations: Case Study of Shanghai Commercial And Savings Bank, China Assurance Corporation Ltd, and China Travel Agency Centre of Asian Studies Department, July 1998 - June 2000)
Andrea McElderry. "Confucian Capitalism?: Corporate Values in Republican Banking" (Univ. of Louisville) Modern China, Vol. 12, No. 3 (Jul., 1986), pp. 401–416 (c) 1986 Sage Publication Inc.
Whither Japan - Page 122 by Shuxi Xu - 1941 | Today's announcement follows three months' negotiations with US financial mission headed by Dr. KP Chen. It was further announced that the credits would be ... 
Morgenthau Diary (China): Prepared by the Subcommittee to Investigate the Administration of the ... - Page 551 | by United States. Congress. Senate. Judiciary - 1965 | On his return from Chungking to Hong Kong, Mr. Cochran had a talk with KP Chen in which the latter indicated his desire to withdraw from the Board. ... 
Morgenthau Diary (China): Prepared by the Subcommittee to Investigate the Administration of the ... - Page 885 | by United States. Congress. Senate. Judiciary - 1965 | Mr. KP CHEN On April 17, 1942 Mr. KP Chen, chairman of the Currency Stabilization Board, appeared much older and more fatigued than the year before when he ... 
Interlocking Subversion in Government Departments: Hearing Before the Subcommittee to Investigate ... - Page 2337 | by United States. Congress. Senate. Committee on the Judiciary - 1954 | I told him that I learned from Mr. KP Chen that wood oil, tung oil, the annual production is about 44000 tons a year and in about five years, ... 
The Amerasia Spy Case: Prelude to McCarthyism - Page 21 | by Harvey Klehr - History - 1996 - 280 pages | In 1940 Solomon Adler and Frank Coe, another Treasury Department employee who was a member of the CPUSA, introduced Chi to KP Chen, the Nationalist ... 
The Amerasia Papers: A Clue to the Catastrophe of China ... Prepared by the Subcommittee to ... - Pages 1216, 1373, 1374 | by United States. Congress. Senate. Judiciary Committee - 1970 | It has been learned that Keswick proposed the formation of a Chinese company in the United States by KP Chen and Bang HOT and others ... 
A History of Modern Shanghai Banking: The Rise and Decline of China's Financial Capitalism - Page 293 | by Zhaojin Ji - Business & Economics - 2003 - 325 pages | ... fl Chase Bank Chen Bulei Chen Guangfu (KP Chen) Chen Guofu Chen Yun ... 
Institute of Pacific Relations: Hearings, Eighty-second Congress, First[-second] Session ... | by United States. Congress. Senate. Committee on the Judiciary - 1953 | ... I told him that so far as I was informed, ! in this country, having arrived with KP Chen, but that to get 1 public perhaps is difficult. ... 
Shanghai: Revolution and Development in an Asian Metropolis - Page 9 | edited by Christopher Howe - Science - 1981 - 461 pages | ... the Chien brothers (Chien Chao-nan and Chien Yu-chieh) and the bankers, KP Chen (Ch'en Kuang-fu) and Chang Kia-ngau (Chang Chia-ao). ... 
Guide to Nanking and the Nanyang Exposition - Page 9 | 1910 - 55 pages | KP Chen Hwei-teh, 13.
83-1: Executive Sessions of The Senate Permanent Subcommittee on Investigations of The Committee ... - Page 3433 | by United States. Congress. Senate. Committee on Governmental Affairs - 2003 | There were also Chinese members of the boards, Mr. KP Chen was one, and he was the head of the Shanghai Commercial Bank, and Mr. Tsu ... 
The Life and Political Economy of Lauchlin Currie: New Dealer, Presidential Advisor and ... - Page 392 | by Roger J. Sandilands - 1990 | ... the finance minister whom he urged the Generalissimo to replace by someone more honest and efficient. He recommended KP Chen as an alternative. ... 
The Cambridge History of China - Page 775 | edited by John K. Fairbank, Denis Twitchett - History - 1983 - 1120 pages | ... the interests of the Chinese residents on the Shanghai Municipal Council), he was in touch with the bankers Sung Han-chang and KP Chen as well as the ... 
Repeal of Silver Purchase Acts: Hearings Before a Subcommittee of the Committee on Banking and ... - Page 38 | by United States. Congress. Senate. Committee on Banking and Currency - 1955 - 368 pages | ... The Chinese representatives were: KP Chen, YC Koo, and P. W. Kuo. Apparently the
Shanghai Money Market - Page 26 | by Shinwei Peng - 1946 - 56 pages | Mr. KP Chen, founder and chairman of the Shanghai Commercial and Savings Bank a year or so ago assured the author that the aim of that bank was to help ... 
The China Journal - Page 221 | by China Society of Arts and Science | It is being sponsored whole-heartedly by such prominent Chinese leaders as Dr. PW Kuo, Mr. Ling Kang-hou, Mr. Yue Tso-ting, Mr. KP Chen, Mr. Tu Yueh-sen, ..
"China To-day" Series - Page 83 | 1934 | A Standing Committee of the Board was elected, the members being Mr. T. V. Soong, Chairman of the Bank of China, Mr. Hu Chun, Mr. KP Chen, Mr. YM Chien, ... 
Appalachia - Page 296 by Boston Appalachian Mountain Club | One of these cultured gentlemen was Mr. KP Chen, a banker well known on both sides of the Pacific, and another was Mr. Pan, who was installing comfortable ... 
Journal - Page 23 by American Chamber of Commerce of the Philippines | ... ability of his Chinese associates on the board: Chairman KP Chen, of the Shanghai Commercial Bank; ... 
No Fears, Hidden Tears: A Memoir of Four Score Years : the Autobiography of John Lewis Keeshin - Page 84 by John Lewis Keeshin - 1983
China Today: Chin Jih Chung-kuo - Page 4 by Taiwan China Today Society, T'ai-pei Institute of Chinese Culture, Institute for Advanced Chinese studies, China Today Society, Chung-kuo wen hua hsüeh yüan. Chung-Kuo wen hua yen chiu so, Tai pei Chung-Kuo wen hua yen chiu so, Inc United Publishing Center, Chinese Institute of Translation and Research
Going to War with Japan, 1937-1941 - Page 194 by Jonathan G Utley - History - 2005 - 256 pages Harry Dexter White memo, March 16, July 12, 1938, folder 189, box 62, RG 56; Morgenthau diary, box 127, 109; HH Kung letter to KP Chen, Aug.
Banking in Modern China: Entrepreneurs, Professional Managers, and the Development of Chinese ... - Page 257 by Linsun Cheng
Chinese Economic Journal and Bulletin by China. Shi ye bu. Guo ji mao yi ju, China. Jing ji tao lun chu. Published by Bureau of Foreign Trade, Ministry of Industry [etc.]
Chinese Economic Bulletin - Page 104 | by China. Jing ji tao lun chu, China. Industrial and Commercial Information Bureau, China. Shi ye bu. Guo ji mao yi ju | ... who are as follows:— Li Ming, General Manager of the Chekiang Industrial Bank; KP Chen, General Manager of the Shanghai Commercial and Savings Bank;
Chinese Economic Journal and Bulletin - Page 187 | by China. Shi ye bu. Guo ji mao yi ju, China. Jing ji tao lun chu | KP Chen and John H. Chen, Managing Directors of the Bank. The Chairmanship of the Board of Directors was entrusted to Dr. HH Kung. The Board of Supervisors ... 
Chinese Economic Bulletin - Page 240 | by China. Jing ji tao lun chu, China. Industrial and Commercial Information Bureau, China. Shi ye bu. Guo ji mao yi ju
Chinese Economic Bulletin - Page 263 | by China. Jing ji tao lun chu, China. Industrial and Commercial Information Bureau, China. Shi ye bu. Guo ji mao yi ju
Chinese Economic Bulletin - Page 253 | by China. Jing ji tao lun chu, China. Industrial and Commercial Information Bureau, China. Shi ye bu. Guo ji mao yi ju
Chinese Economic Bulletin - Page 382 | by China. Jing ji tao lun chu, China. Industrial and Commercial Information Bureau, China. Shi ye bu. Guo ji mao yi ju
 Lee P.T. Banker and banking business in modern China: conference and publication of the diaries of K.P. Chen—To study banker and banking business in modern China: conference and publication of the diaries of K.P. Chen (Hang Seng Bank Golden Jubilee Education Fund for Research, July 2001)
 "Tung Oil Wanted" Apr. 6, 1942, TIME magazine
Time Inc.'s Nanking correspondent, Frederick Gruin, Monday, Oct. 20, 1947
"Everyday Life" Mar. 18, 1940, Time magazine
"Emergency As Usual," Dec. 22, 1941, Time magazine
Chen Guangfu Pioneered China's Modern Tourism; Part 2 Yao Huiyuan, Cao Lingjiao, Jeffery Seow

External links
Finding aid to the K.P. Chen papers at Columbia University Rare Book & Manuscript Library
Personal papers of Chen Guangfu / K. P. Chen deposited in the Rare Book and Manuscript Library, Columbia University.

1880 births
1976 deaths
Businesspeople from Jiangsu
Chinese bankers
Taiwanese bankers
People from Zhenjiang
Taiwanese people from Jiangsu
Wharton School of the University of Pennsylvania alumni
Members of the 1st Legislative Yuan
Members of the 1st Legislative Yuan in Taiwan